Jennifer Miller (also known as Saint Reverend Jen and Reverend Jen; born July 24, 1972 in Silver Spring, Maryland) is an American performer, actress, writer, painter, director, preacher, and poet residing in Manhattan, New York City.

In 2002, Miller was named the Village Voice's "Best D.I.Y. Go-Girl" in the category of "Over 21".

Career 
Miller formerly wrote the I Did It for Science column for nerve.com and  writes a column entitled Diary of an Art Star for Artnet. She is also associated with several movements and projects that were launched as a response to various popular concepts. Some examples include the Anti-Slam open mike movement and the Mr. Lower East Side Pageant, with was founded to "counteract the objectification of the female body in art".

Miller has written multiple books such as Reverend Jen's Really Cool Neighborhood and has written for other projects such as The Adventures of Electra Elf and Fluffer, a low budget Public-access television show produced by Nick Zedd.

Miller helped create the "Art Star" movement of performers, artists, poets, and other individuals centered around the Lower East Side of Manhattan. She has also acted as the founder for several projects, such as the magazine Art Star Scene and with her former boyfriend Courtney Fathom Sell, co-founded ASS Studios.

Miller is the curator of the Troll Museum, which collects history, toys, and memorabilia associated with the Troll doll. The museum closed in 2016, after she was evicted from her rent-controlled apartment.

In 2018, she did an art show called Rev Jen's Mid-Career Survey, which opened at MF Gallery on January 13 and closed on February 13. On one occasion, she showed two of her films, Creature Double Feature and Satan, Hold my Hand.

Anti-Slam

Miller began the Anti-Slam movement at Collective: Unconscious in 1995 as a reaction to the Poetry Slam movement on the Lower East Side. At a traditional poetry slam, performers are given a score of 1–10 by a panel of five judges, whereas at an Anti-Slam event performers are given a perfect score regardless of the content or quality of their performance.

On October 17, 2007, Miller announced that the then-current performance would be the final anti-slam. The following year, Miller revived the movement as a monthly event.

Filmography 
Satan Hold My Hand (2013)
Blood Possession (short 2013)
The Trachtenburg Family Slideshow Players: Off & On Broadway (2006)
Electra Elf: The Beginning Parts One & Two (2005) – directed by Nick Zedd
I Was a Quality of Life Violation (2004) – directed by Nick Zedd
Lord of the Cockrings (2002) – directed by Nick Zedd
Thus Spake Zarathustra (2001) – directed by Nick Zedd
Elf Panties: The Movie (2001) – – directed by Nick Zedd edited by Andreas Troeger
Terror Firmer (1999)

Stage performances
Housatrash (2000, as Joanie)

Bibliography 

June (2015)
Reverend Jen's Really Cool Neighborhood (2003)
Live Nude Elf: The Sexperiments of Reverend Jen (2008)
Elf Girl (2011) 
BDSM 101 (2013)
Sex Symbol for the Insane
Cliff Notes for Sex Symbol for the Insane
Diary of an Art Star
Magical Elf Panties : A Coloring Book
Elf Panties: Audio-Visual Fun!
Reverend Jen's Really Cool Neighborhood/Les Misrahi
Treasuries of the Troll Museum
Being a Supermodel is Cool
Being Different is Cool
Be Careful What You Wish For: A Coloring Book
Beer is Magic
Don't Call Me Rat-Dog!
People Who Don't Like My Work Are Bad People: A Memoir
Reverend Jen's Trip to the Hospital
Reverend Jen Junior Groovee Paper Dolls
Reverend Jen Paper Doll Fun

Other releases 
Rev Jen's Greatest Hits – Spoken word album (audio cassette)
"Don't Call Me Rat Dog" on the compilation album, Rachel Trachtenburg's Homemade World

References

External links 

1972 births
20th-century American painters
21st-century American painters
American women painters
Writers from Manhattan
Living people
Actresses from New York City
American film actresses
People from Silver Spring, Maryland
Performance art in New York City
Film directors from Maryland
American women poets
20th-century American poets
21st-century American poets
20th-century American women writers
21st-century American women writers
20th-century American women artists
21st-century American women artists
20th-century American actresses
21st-century American actresses
Artists from Maryland
Film directors from New York City
Painters from New York City
Painters from Maryland
American women performance artists
American performance artists
American columnists
American women columnists
Journalists from New York City
American women non-fiction writers
20th-century American non-fiction writers
21st-century American non-fiction writers